The 2012 U.S. F2000 National Championship is a season of the U.S. F2000 National Championship, an open wheel auto racing series that is the first step in IndyCar's Road to Indy ladder. It is the third full season of the series since its revival in 2010. Rookie Australian/American driver Matthew Brabham, son of Geoff Brabham, captured the title over is Cape Motosports teammate, second-year American Spencer Pigot by seven points in the final pair of races at Virginia International Raceway. Even though Pigot won the final two races of the season, Brabham's lead was large enough and his finishes in the final two races were high enough to capture the championship. Brabham only won four races compared to Pigot's eight wins. However, Brabham only failed to finish in the top-10 once with a single DNF while Pigot finished outside the top-10 three times in what would ultimately decide the championship. The only other driver to capture a race win during the season was Belardi Auto Racing's Scott Anderson.

Norwegian Henrik Furuseth captured the National Class championship over American R. C. Enerson in the final race of the season when Enerson was involved in an incident in the first lap of the race after passing Furuseth. The crash dropped Enerson to third in points as Mark Eaton finished second in class in the race and edged out Enerson for second place in National Class by four points.

One notable driver to compete in the championship was Michael Johnson of Flint, Michigan who is a paraplegic, having lost use of his legs in a motorcycle racing accident. Johnson finished 15th in points with a best finish of tenth at Road America.

Drivers and teams
 In line with U.S. F2000 regulations, National Class cars were ineligible to compete at Lucas Oil Raceway at Indianapolis.

Race calendar and results
The race schedule was announced on January 11, 2012. Fourteen races were announced, all at venues that hosted the series in 2011. The final race weekend's location and date were announced on January 17, 2012.

Championship standings

Championship Class

National Class

Teams'

References

External links
U.S. F2000 National Championship official website

U.S. F2000 National Championship seasons
U.S. F2000 National Championship